Lacunospora is a lichenized genus of fungi within the Lasiosphaeriaceae family.

References

Lasiosphaeriaceae